Franklin County Schools or Franklin County School District may refer to:

 Franklin County Public Schools (Kentucky) in Kentucky
 Franklin County School District (Georgia)
 Franklin County School District (Mississippi)
 Franklin County Schools (Alabama)
 Franklin County Schools (Florida)
 Franklin County Schools (North Carolina)
 Franklin County Schools (Tennessee)
 Franklin County Schools (Virginia)